Funny How Love Is may refer to:

"Funny How Love Is", a song by Queen from Queen II
"Funny How Love Is", a song by Fine Young Cannibals from Fine Young Cannibals